William H. Stead (June 12, 1858 – April 13, 1918) was an American politician and lawyer.

Born on a farm near Marseilles, Illinois, Stead went to Central Normal College, in Ladoga, Indiana and DePauw University. In 1882, Stead was admitted to the Illinois bar and practiced law in Ottawa, Illinois. He served as Ottawa City Attorney and States Attorney for LaSalle County, Illinois. Stead was a Republican. From 1905 until 1913, Stead served as Illinois Attorney General. He was chief counsel for Chicago and Rock Island Railway Company and also served as Director of the Illinois Department of Trade and Commerce. In 1918, Stead committed suicide with a firearm in a hotel in Chicago, Illinois.

Notes

1858 births
1918 suicides
People from Marseilles, Illinois
Canterbury College (Indiana) alumni
DePauw University alumni
Illinois Republicans
Illinois Attorneys General
American politicians who committed suicide
Suicides by firearm in Illinois
19th-century American politicians
1918 deaths